The following is a list of state and official visits made by Canada since the country's Confederation in 1867. These trips consist of either the monarch or a representative—the governor general, a lieutenant governor, or another member of the royal family—visiting a foreign country in an official capacity, either representing the Canadian people in a full state visit or simply in ceremonies related to Canada abroad. In some cases, such as royal weddings in the United Kingdom or D-Day commemoration ceremonies in France, the Canadian monarch and/or one or more other members of the Royal Family and the governor general will be present together.

Visits

1860s

1920s

1930s

1940s

1950s

1970s

1980s

1990s

2000s

2010s

2020s

See also
 Royal tours of Canada
 United States presidential visits to Canada

References

Official visits
Canada
Canada